The Bandits is a grand ballet in two acts and five scenes with prologue, choreographed by Marius Petipa to music by Léon Minkus. The libretto by Marius Petipa is based on Miguel de Cervantes' novella La gitanilla.

The work was first presented by the Imperial Ballet on January 26/February 7 (Julian/Gregorian calendar dates), 1875 at the Imperial Bolshoi Kammeny Theatre in St. Petersburg, Russia.

Principal dancers: Ekaterina Vazem.

Ballets by Marius Petipa
Ballets by Ludwig Minkus
1875 ballet premieres
Works based on La gitanilla
Ballets premiered at the Bolshoi Theatre, Saint Petersburg